= Korean Day Parade =

Annual parade in New York City

The Korean Day Parade is an annual event that takes place in New York City. The event usually takes place on the first Saturday of October.
